Vichan Choocherd (born 9 September 1966) is a Thai sprinter. He competed in the men's 4 × 100 metres relay at the 1984 Summer Olympics.

References

1966 births
Living people
Athletes (track and field) at the 1984 Summer Olympics
Vichan Choocherd
Vichan Choocherd
Place of birth missing (living people)